Steven R. J. Brueck is an American engineer, currently a Distinguished Professor at University of New Mexico. He is a Fellow of the American Association for the Advancement of Science, Institute of Electrical and Electronics Engineers and Optical Society.

Education

B.S., Columbia University

M.S. Massachusetts Institute of Technology

Ph.D., Massachusetts Institute of Technology

References

Year of birth missing (living people)
Living people
University of New Mexico faculty
21st-century American engineers
Columbia University alumni
MIT School of Engineering alumni